The Body in the Library is a 3-part 1984 television film adaptation of Agatha Christie's 1942 detective novel The Body in the Library, which was co-produced by the BBC and the A&E Network. The film uses an adapted screenplay by T. R. Bowen and was directed by Silvio Narizzano. Starring Joan Hickson in the title role, it was the first film presented in the British television series Miss Marple and premiered in three parts from 26 to 28 December 1984 on BBC One. In the United States the film was first broadcast on 4 January 1986 as a part of PBS's Mystery!. In his review in The New York Times, critic John J. O'Connor wrote: Miss Christie would no doubt approve of Joan Hickson, the veteran British character actress who plays Miss Marple... This BBC/Arts & Entertainment co-production offers an especially good example of Agatha Christie in adaptation. The characters are nicely realized and the suspense holds. Miss Hickson is lovely, neither as awesome as Miss Rutherford nor as overly cute as Helen Hayes. And the supporting cast is admirable, particularly Gwen Watford as Dolly and David Horovitch as Inspector Slack. As someone notes about the case, "you'll have to admit it has all the bizarre elements of a cheap thriller." Once hooked, you won't be able to turn it off.

The Body in the Library was repeated on BBC Four in September and October 2013.

Plot
Miss Marple helps her neighbours the Bantrys when a lovely young girl is found dead in their library. The girl is traced to a seaside resort and the desperate family of a wealthy old man.

Cast
Joan Hickson as Miss Marple  
David Horovitch as Detective Inspector Slack  
Gwen Watford as Dolly Bantry  
Moray Watson as Colonel Bantry  
Frederick Jaeger as Colonel Melchett  
Valentine Dyall as Lorrimer 
Anthony Smee as Basil Blake  
Debbie Arnold as Dinah Lee 
Andrew Cruickshank as Conway Jefferson 
Ciaran Madden as Adelaide Jefferson 
Keith Drinkel as Mark Gaskell 
Hugh Walters as Mr Prescott 
Jess Conrad as Raymond Starr 
Trudie Styler as Josie Turner 
John Moffatt as Edwards 
Arthur Bostrom as George Bartlett 
Stephen Churchett as Major Reeve 
Astra Sheridan as Pamela Reeve 
Raymond Francis as Sir Henry Clithering  
Ian Brimble as Detective Constable Lake  
John Bardon as PC Palk  
Anne Rutter as Mrs Palk  
Karin Foley as Mary 
Colin Higgins as Malcolm    
Sarah Whitlock as WPC  
Sydney Livingstone as Mr Brogan  
Andrew Downer as Peter Carmody 
Sally Jane Jackson as Ruby Keene 
Kathleen Breck as Bridget 
Martyn Read as Hugo McLean 
Karen Seacombe as Florrie Small 
John Evans as Inch
Jacqui Munro as the body

References

External links

British television films
BBC television dramas
Films based on Miss Marple books
1984 television films
1984 films
Films directed by Silvio Narizzano